Henry David 'Leo' Wescott (8 July 1900 – 25 February 1970) was an Australian rules footballer who played with Collingwood in the Victorian Football League (VFL).

Wescott was a back pocket specialist and started his career at Collingwood in 1922. He played in the Collingwood premiership sides of 1927 and 1929.

In 1930 he moved to Tasmania where he played for Longford in the Northern Tasmanian Football Association, winning the Tasman Shields Trophy for the competition's Best and Fairest player. He returned to Collingwood in 1931 before playing his last game for the Magpies at the end of the 1932 season.

After a season at Kyneton, Wescott spent five years as captain-coach Prahran and steered them to the 1937 premiership. He finished his coaching career with a stint at Sandringham.

References

External links

1900 births
Collingwood Football Club players
Collingwood Football Club Premiership players
Longford Football Club players
Prahran Football Club players
Prahran Football Club coaches
Sandringham Football Club coaches
Kyneton Football Club players
Australian rules footballers from Melbourne
1970 deaths
Two-time VFL/AFL Premiership players
People from Clifton Hill, Victoria